Francis Powers (June 4, 1865 Virginia –  May 10, 1940 Santa Monica, California) was a silent film actor, screenwriter, and director from the United States.

Selected filmography
Clothes (1914)
The Port of Missing Men (1914
The Ring and the Man (1914)
The Little Gray Lady (1914)
 Shadows of Conscience (1921)
 Rouged Lips (1923)
 Playing It Wild (1923)
The Love Trap (1923)
The Dramatic Life of Abraham Lincoln (1924)
The Iron Horse (1924)
Lightnin' (1925) (uncredited)
Thank You (1925) (uncredited)
The Fighting Heart (1925) (uncredited)

References

1865 births
1940 deaths
20th-century American male actors
American male silent film actors
American male screenwriters
American film directors
20th-century American male writers
20th-century American screenwriters